The flag and coat of arms of Walloon Brabant consists of a yellow lion on a black triangle, on a yellow background. The upper right and left corners each contain a red rooster. The lion is the symbol of the duchy of Brabant, while the rooster can also be found in the flag of the Walloon Region.

References

Walloon Brabant
Walloon Brabant
Walloon Brabant
Walloon Brabant
Walloon Brabant
Walloon Brabant
Flags displaying animals